Julien Durand (born 15 March 1983) is a French association footballer who is currently a fitness coach and occasional player for Stade Bordelais. He plays as a midfielder or forward.

Career
Durand made his debut for Etoile FC in the 2–0 win over Geylang United on the 17 February 2011. He then went on to join Gombak United in the S.League in the first transfer window of the season in 2012.

Durand joined French amateur side Jeunesse Villenave as fitness coach in July 2014. In 2016 Durand he moved to French Championnat de France Amateur 2 side Stade Bordelais, again primarily as fitness coach, although he was registered as a player for the match against Nice reserves in Championnat National 2 on 27 January 2018.

References

External links
 
 Julien Durand at thefinalball.com

Living people
1983 births
French footballers
Expatriate footballers in Singapore
Gombak United FC players
French Ministers of Commerce and Industry
Singapore Premier League players
Stade Bordelais (football) players
Association football forwards
 Association football midfielders
Étoile FC players